11 Orionis is a solitary Ap star in the equatorial constellation of Orion, near the border with Taurus. It is visible to the naked eye with an apparent visual magnitude of 4.65, and it is located approximately 365 light years away from the Sun based on parallax. The star is moving further from the Sun with a heliocentric radial velocity of +16.8 km/s.

This object is a chemically peculiar star, known as an Ap star, with enhanced silicon and chromium lines in its spectrum. It is an α² CVn variable, ranging from 4.65 to 4.69 magnitude with a period of 4.64 days.

References

B-type subgiants
A-type main-sequence stars
Alpha2 Canum Venaticorum variables
Ap stars
Orion (constellation)
BD+15 732
Orionis, 11
032549
023607
1638
Orionis, V1032